The 1951 UCI Track Cycling World Championships were the World Championship for track cycling. They took place in Milan, Italy from 24 to 28 August 1951. Five events for men were contested, 3 for professionals and 2 for amateurs.

Medal summary

Medal table

See also
 1951 UCI Road World Championships

References

Track cycling
UCI Track Cycling World Championships by year
International cycle races hosted by Italy
Sports competitions in Milan
1951 in track cycling
August 1951 sports events in Europe
1950s in Milan